Washington County Airport  is three miles (5 km) southwest of Washington in South Franklin Township, Pennsylvania. It is owned and operated by Washington County and is in the Greater Pittsburgh metropolitan area.

Most U.S. airports use the same three-letter location identifier for the FAA and IATA, but Washington County Airport is AFJ to the FAA and WSG to the IATA.

At one time, it hosted memorials for DeLloyd Thompson, a famous early pilot from Washington County, but those memorials had been discarded. In 2013 and 2014, Clay Kilgore, executive director of the Washington County Historical Society, led an effort to restore the plaques to the airport.

Facilities 

The airport is a relief airport for other airports such as Pittsburgh International Airport and Allegheny County Airport.

Washington County Airport has a  runway and a full parallel taxiway system lit for night operations. It has a partial electronic guidance system consisting of a Localizer, Distance Measuring Equipment and Non-directional beacon. The non-precision approach is available as well. The airport also has a Remote Communications Outlet and an Automated Surface Observing System. The first Instrument Landing System (ILS) approved by the Federal Aviation Administration was added in 2003.

The airport is home to 94 aircraft: 70 single-engine, 17 multi-engine, five jets and two helicopters. The airport sees about 110 operations per day. Roughly 60% of Washington County Airport's traffic is local general aviation while 24% is general transportation. 17% of the operations are air charter while less than 1% is military use.

References

External links

Airports in Pennsylvania
County airports in Pennsylvania
Transportation buildings and structures in Washington County, Pennsylvania